Ursa Major (Mikhail Uriokovitch Ursus) is a fictional character, a mutant appearing in American comic books published by Marvel Comics. The character has been depicted as a member of the Soviet Super-Soldiers.

The character appeared as a human in the live-action Marvel Cinematic Universe film Black Widow (2021), portrayed by Olivier Richters.

Publication history

His first appearance was in Incredible Hulk (vol. 2) #258, and the character was created by Bill Mantlo and Sal Buscema.

Fictional character biography
Born in Blagoveshchensk, Mikhail Ursus was one of the first known mutants born in the Soviet Union in the 20th Century to survive past childhood. Up until the time of his birth, the Soviet government had killed all mutants at the first manifestation of their superhuman powers. In Mikhail's case this was at a young age and he was abandoned in the mountains, growing up amongst the animals of the forest and presumably using his shape-changing power to survive.

Due to the efforts of scientist Piotr Phobos, the government was made to see the potential value of superhumans serving the state and Phobos soon opened a private school to train mutants. Mikhail Ursus was among the first of the many mutants trained by Professor Phobos. Unknown to both his students and the Soviet government, Phobos had built a device to siphon off energy from his students to give himself artificial powers of his own. The process tended to kill the subjects after a time, and Phobos explained their deaths as training casualties. When the second Red Guardian discovered Phobos's scheme, he managed to overpower her and went into hiding, but not before giving two of his students, Darkstar and Vanguard, graduation 'gifts' through which he could continue to siphon their power.

Following certain field work, Mikhail, Darkstar and Vanguard (the three best-trained students of Phobos's school) were reunited and organized by the government into the elite Soviet Super-Soldiers, a team of Soviet government agents. Ursus was given the code name Ursa Major (though he is also known as 'Major Ursus'). The first mission of the Soviet Super-Soldiers was to investigate the contained radioactive area of Khystym known as the Forbidden Zone and to stop the Presence. There they encountered the Hulk, and discovered that their former teacher Professor Phobos was engaged in a project to radioactively contaminate all of the Soviet Union in order to foster the birth of more mutants whose powers he could eventually siphon. The Soviet Super-Soldiers, aided by the Hulk, thwarted Phobos's plan and brought him before the government to stand trial.

Although the Super-Soldiers resolved to remain together as a team, they vowed to never again unquestioningly serve the state. They have subsequently undertaken one government mission, but generally act independently. They were based in a scientific fortress in the region of Khystym.

Ursa Major later battled the Red Ghost alongside the Soviet Super-Soldiers. With the Soviet Super-Soldiers, he was dispatched to capture Magneto, and battled the X-Men and the Avengers. With Vanguard and Darkstar, Ursa Major later attempted to defect to the United States, but they were beaten comatose by the Supreme Soviets.

Later, Ursa Major followed Vanguard into the employ of General Tskarov, a communist sympathizer who wanted to undermine American business along the East coast. They only agreed, however, in order to find the missing Darkstar, who (as Ursa later discovered) was in fact being experimented on in Tskarov's own laboratory. Ursa, Darkstar, and Vanguard then joined the Black Widow and Daredevil in defeating Tskarov.

Ursa Major is one of the few mutants in the world to retain their powers after Decimation. Ursa Major returns as part of the Winter Guard, helping them and War Machine fight off a Skrull attempt to steal Russian nuclear bombs. Despite orders to the contrary, the entire Guard assists War Machine in killing or driving off the invaders.

The Winter Guard would soon fight a group of superhuman Soviet revolutionaries called Remont Six. This group is led by Iron Maiden and they come into conflict with the Guard when they raid an A.I.M. facility. Ursa Major would fight the Snow Leopards and Volga. The Winter Guard prevail and defeat the Remont Six. Later, Ursa and the rest of the Winter Guard team up with the Agents of Atlas to battle Warlord Krang. After teaming up with the Protectorate (including former Winter Guard members Powersurge and Vanguard), Ursa and the rest of the Winter Guard battle the Presence and former Winter Guard member turned Dire Wraith Fantasma and their Dire Wraith children.

He was later seen in a Russian gulag, forced to battle Bucky Barnes, who had been surrendered to the Russian government for alleged crimes as the Winter Soldier, convicted in absentia. When asked by the prison warden why Ursa Major had been incarcerated, Colonel Rostov replied "it's not too difficult to find treason or corruption charges on any government agent."

Following the "Secret Empire" storyline, Ursa Major is seen as a member of the Black Widow Ops Program where they cloned Black Widow following her death at the hands of Captain America's Hydra Supreme counterpart. He bribed Epsilon Red to let him add her current memories while secretly disposing of the bad programming.

At some point, Ursa Major was incarcerated in a gulag. He was approached by a Russian official who states that they are bringing the Winter Guard back together while presenting a pardon as a condition of him joining. Ursa Major accepted under the condition that they can expunge his criminal record as well. Ursa Major later represented the Russian government when he attended Black Panther's meeting in the Eden Room of Avengers Mountain. He started to get aggressive towards Black Panther. This caused Black Panther to have Avengers Mountain's teleportation system send Ursa Major to Siberia. Afterwards, Black Panther apologized and commented to the other representatives that he hoped that the Russian government would send Crimson Dynamo and that they sent Ursa Major on purpose. Black Panther concluded that they will not be getting any allies from Russia.

During the War of the Realms storyline, Ursa Major is seen talking to Gorilla-Man in the Wundagore Zoo in Transia, discussing about an undercover operation he is running for Black Panther, until Ka-Zar shows up to pick up Gorilla-Man and take him to Avengers Mountain.

Powers and abilities
Ursa Major has the mutant ability to transform himself into a large anthropomorphic bear. While in this form, Ursa Major retains his human intelligence and ability to speak, though his personality does become more feral and he begins to lose control over his human intelligence if he remains in his transformed state for several hours consecutively. Ursa Major was trained by the Soviet Military, and trained in the use of his powers by Professor Phobos, being a graduate of Professor Phobos's mutant training school.

While transformed, Ursa Major possesses superhuman strength, stamina and resistance to physical injury to a much greater degree than an actual bear of similar size possesses. His strength is sufficient to allow him to engage in a one-on-one battle with The Hulk and survive. His senses are also heightened to a superhuman degree, particularly his sense of smell, which he can use to track a target by scent. Also, like a real bear, Ursa Major possesses non-retractable claws. These claws are relatively blunt, as they are with an actual bear, but can be used as effective weapons when coupled with his great strength.

Other versions

Civil War: House of M
Ursa Major is seen as a member of the Soviet Super-Soldiers in the House of M.

Marvel Zombies
In the Marvel Zombies universe, Ursa Major works as a guard for the Kingpin's human clone vats. He attacks the Earth-616 Machine Man and tries to bite his head off. Machine Man extrudes spikes from his head, killing Ursa Major.

In other media

Television
 Ursa Major makes a non-speaking appearance in the Avengers Assemble episode "Secret Avengers". This version is a member of the Winter Guard.
 Ursa Major appears in the Marvel Future Avengers anime series, voiced by Kenji Nomura in Japanese and JB Blanc in English. This version is a member of the Winter Guard.

Film
Ursa Major appears in the live-action Marvel Cinematic Universe (MCU) film Black Widow (2021), portrayed by Olivier Richters. This version is an inmate of the Seventh Circle prison alongside Alexei Shostakov and only appears in his human form.

Video games 
Ursa Major appears briefly during the story of Lego Marvel Super Heroes during the 2nd level alongside the rest of the Soviet Super-Soldiers. He later reappears in a Side-quest asking the player to help him rescue his teammates from the mind control of the Presence.

References

External links
 
 Ursa Major at Marvel Wiki

Characters created by Bill Mantlo
Characters created by Sal Buscema
Comics characters introduced in 1981
Fictional characters with superhuman senses
Fictional Russian people
Fictional Soviet Army personnel
Marvel Comics characters who are shapeshifters
Marvel Comics characters with superhuman strength
Marvel Comics mutants
Marvel Comics superheroes
Soviet Union-themed superheroes